Damien John Richardson (born 2 August 1947 in Dublin) is an Irish football manager and former player. His most recent job was as manager of Drogheda United. Richardson formerly managed Gillingham in England and Cobh Ramblers, Shelbourne and Shamrock Rovers in Ireland.  He is also known for his media work, including Monday Night Soccer.

Player
As a player Richardson's career was divided between Shamrock Rovers and Gillingham. He made his Rovers debut in a 2–1 friendly win over Sunderland at Roker Park on 10 August 1963. His competitive debut came eight days later as Rovers beat Shelbourne 3–0 at Tolka Park in a Dublin City Cup clash. While at Rovers he twice won the FAI Cup in 1968 and 1969 (scoring in the final replay) as well as getting an Inter League cap and represented the club 5 times in the UEFA Cup Winners Cup. He received the first of three international caps for the Irish national team while at Shamrock Rovers, making his debut against Austria in Linz in October 1971. He scored in his final appearance for Rovers on 22 October 1972 at Milltown.

He moved to the English Fourth Division side Gillingham at the age of 25. He played for the Priestfield Stadium side for the next nine years before being released in 1981. During his time there he scored 100 goals and was named Player of the Season for 1974–75.

Manager
Richardson's managerial career began in 1989 where he managed Gillingham, having previously served as the club's youth team manager. A rather lacklustre career there ended in 1992, and he returned to Ireland in 1993 to manage Cork City. He proved an instant success bringing the club within striking distance of retaining the league title. However, after 18 months he left the club after a dispute with then chairman Pat O'Donovan.

Following Cork City, he moved on another Cork side Cobh Ramblers before taking up the management position at Shelbourne. His time at Shelbourne saw two Cup successes (1995–96 and 1996–97), one League of Ireland Cup (1995–96) and a runner up position in the League (1997–98) in three seasons. His failure to win the league ultimately cost him his job.

He moved to his old club Shamrock Rovers, where his tenure for three seasons failed to result in a trophy. Ultimately, Richardson and club chairman Joe Colwell disagreed on the direction of the club, and parted ways in April 2002. Colwell wanted to focus on building a new stadium for the club, while Richardson wanted to focus on a full-time panel of players.

In 2005 Richardson returned to League of Ireland management when Cork City's manager Pat Dolan was dramatically sacked before the start of pre-season friendlies. Cork City chairman Brian Lennox signed the 57-year-old Richardson to a two-year contract at Turners Cross 15 days before the first competitive match of the season. Richardson commented that the Cork City job was the only one that could have brought him back to League of Ireland management. Despite being hospitalised in September in his first season in charge Cork City were crowned League of Ireland champions for the second time in the club's history. Cork City also reached the final of the FAI Cup but were defeated by Drogheda United. The 2006 and 2007 seasons saw 4th-place positions for his club in both years. In 2007 Richardson led Cork City to FAI Cup victory, but left shortly afterwards following some controversy, and a financial settlement agreement.

In 2010 Damien was selected by the FAI to manage a League of Ireland XI to play a full-strength Manchester United side in the opening match of the Aviva Stadium in Dublin. Again in 2011 he was selected by the FAI to manage a League of Ireland XI to play in the Dublin Super Cup at the Aviva Stadium.

Richardson was named as the manager of Drogheda United on 26 July 2014 for the remainder of their league campaign.

Media work
In 2002, Richardson left football management to become a TV soccer pundit with TV3 in Ireland, before returning to the game in 2005. He is now a regular pundit on Monday Night Soccer on Raidió Teilifís Éireann, and is also a regular contributor to RTÉ Radio's coverage of Republic of Ireland international matches. He contributed to RTÉ Sport's coverage of the 2010 FIFA World Cup.

Richardson writes a regular blog for the RTÉ / MNS website, and continues to write a weekly column for a Cork newspaper since his time as manager of Cork City.

Richardson has also supported Red FM's national award-winning "Break the Cycle" anti-speeding campaign. In addition to his media work, he occasionally teaches football team management seminars. Richardson also once played the bodhran on an album (A Kentish Garland) by Tundra, a folk music group from Kent.

Honours

As a player
Shamrock Rovers
 FAI Cup: 1968, 1969
 Top Four Cup: 1966
 Dublin City Cup:1966–67
 Blaxnit Cup: 1967–68
 Leinster Senior Cup: 1968–69
Individual

 Gillingham Player of the Season: 1974–75

As a manager
 Shelbourne
 FAI Cup: 1996, 1997
 League of Ireland Cup: 1995–96

 Cork City
 League of Ireland Premier Division: 2005
 FAI Cup: 2007

Individual
 SWAI Personality of the Year: 2005

Family
Richardson's father George also played and managed in the League of Ireland. He played for Bray Unknowns F.C. and Brideville F.C. and managed St Patrick's Athletic in the 1970s.

References

Bibliography
The Hoops by Paul Doolan and Robert Goggins

1947 births
Living people
Irish association football commentators
Republic of Ireland association footballers
Shamrock Rovers F.C. players
Shamrock Rovers F.C. managers
Gillingham F.C. players
Canterbury City F.C. players
English Football League players
Republic of Ireland football managers
Cork City F.C. managers
Gillingham F.C. managers
League of Ireland players
Shelbourne F.C. managers
League of Ireland managers
Republic of Ireland international footballers
League of Ireland XI managers
League of Ireland XI players
Association football forwards